The YF-130 is a Chinese rocket engine fueled by LOX and kerosene in an oxidizer-rich staged combustion cycle currently in development. It has been designed to reach around 500 tonnes of thrust and it will power the super heavy Long March 9 rocket.

History
Chinese researchers completed a "half-system on full working condition" test of a YF-130 engine in March 2021,  and expect to finish a whole-system test verification by the end of the year. Full system test has been successfully completed on November 6, 2022.

References

Rocket engines of China
Rocket engines using kerosene propellant
Rocket engines using the staged combustion cycle